Wallie Herzer (né Walter Henry Herzer; 15 April 1885 San Francisco – 15 October 1961 Redwood City, California) was an American composer of popular music, music publisher, and pianist.  Herzer flourished in music prior to and during World War I.

The Columbia recording of his 1912 composition, "Everybody Two-Step" — performed by ragtime pianist Mike Bernard on December 2, 1912, in New York City — is the first recording of ragtime music.  It became a hit and coincided at the start of a renewed craze for ragtime and dance — fifteen years after William Krell's "Mississippi Rag" had been published, the first known published music with "rag" in the title.

Herzer composed three other hits — a 1913 piano rag, "Tickle the Ivories" – which also became hit as a vocal arrangement; a 1914 foxtrot song, "Get Over, Sal"; and a 1916 Hawaiian waltz song, "Aloha Land".  Other compositions — including his 1908 piano ragtime two-step and barn dance, "The Rah-Rah Boy", and his 1913 rag turkey trot, "Let's Dance" — were internationally distributed.

Career 
Of the 13 compositions by Herzer in the United States copyright records, there are 8 extant musical scores in national, academic, civic, and private libraries.  The piano rolls and recordings of 4 of those works far exceed the number of compositions.  As of 2014, at least 2 of Herzer's works are included in the repertoire of ragtime artists today.

Herzer published his music while working for insurance agencies in San Francisco.  Beginning 1901, when he was 16, until about 1904, Herzer was a clerk for insurance agents Gutte & Frank (Isidor Gutte; 1833–1908; Julius Gutte; 1828–1900; and William Frank; 1839–19??).  From 1904 to 1920, Herzer was an insurance adjustor and broker for Christensen & Goodwin (Charles H. Christensen; 1839–1921; & Benjamin Frank Goodwin; 1859–1945) at 241 Sansome Street — the same address as his publishing company. From 1920 to 1924, he was the manager of the city department (in San Francisco) for Bentley & Waterman (Leroy Vernon Bentley; 1883–1932; & Clyde Waterman; 1868–1950). In 1924, Herzer became the manager of the city department (in San Francisco) for Glens Falls Insurance Company, headquartered in Glens Falls, New York.

Music critic Winthrop Sargeant, in 1975, stated that the best ragtime came from outside New York and he cited Herzer & Brown, Wallie's first publishing company, as being among publishers of some of the best, earliest, and most imaginative rags.  The title from Herzer's 1914 composition, "Get Over, Sal", was a turn-of-the-19th-century African-American expression for a slow-drag dance step that was incorporated in a variation of the fox trot.  The expression had been published in an earlier song, "Music Hall Song", copyrighted 1879 — popularized by Jenny Hill, the 'Vital Spark':
 You may get over water-butts,
 You may get over fountains,
 But I'll take particular notice
 That you don't get over Sal.
A song rendition of "Everybody Two-Step", published in 1913, became a popular hit in vaudeville. The solo piano and song versions of "Everybody Two-Step", his 1913 composition, "Tickle The Ivories", and his 1916 composition, "Aloha Land", were hits.

Selected compositions 

 "The Rah-Rah Boy"; ragtime two-step and barn dance, for solo piano
 Jerome H. Remick & Co. (Remick), publisher (1908 & 1911); 
 Music Herzer, arranged by Eugene Brown
 Cover: caricature of a male college student smoking a pipe with bulldog; illustrated by L.S. Morgan (né Leland Stanford Morgan; 1886–1981)  (view)
 © November 18, 1908, Class C 194109, Herzer & Brown, San Francisco
 © Transferred to Jerome H. Remick & Co. ("Remick"), Detroit & New York, 1911
 "Rah-rah boy", in that era, was a reference to a college male.  The class of '09 is illustrated on his pipe and sweater.  One of the colors, blue, the bulldog, and the scull and bones insignia — taken as a composite — fits a profile of a Yale student.

 "My Portola Maid"; song
 Herzer, publisher (1909); 
 © August 2, 1909, 2nd copy August 7, 1909, Class E 213111, Wallie Herzer

 "Everybody Two-Step"
 Remick, New York, Detroit, publisher (1911); 
 Cover: caricature of a jolly minstrel or busker banjoist with one or two missing teeth, seated in morning dress: single-breasted black frock coat with notched red-trimmed lapels, red, white, and black-striped top collar, red-trimmed sleeves, lined with single white French-cuffs; white vest; black-and-white checkered bow-tie with matching black-and-white checkered trousers trimmed with white gaiters; gemstone centered on upper shirt- or vest-front below the bow tie; black cap-toe dress shoes with white-stitched welts, topped with red, white, and black striped spats that match the top collar; black top hat with red patterned hat band on ground, brim up, casting a shadow; red background, black lettering, white base — illustrated by L.S. Morgan, 1910 (view) (2nd view)

 Remick, New York, Detroit, publisher
 Cover: full-page, center, ornamental stemmed cocktail glass (pseudo early-art deco), illustration by Starmer?? (#5 view)

 Remick, publisher (1911); 
 For dance orchestra
 Arranged by Ribe Danmark, pseudonym of J. Bodewalt Lampe, staff arranger for Remick

 Remick, publisher (1912); 
 Cover: portrait of Miss Nellie Beaumont is by Starmer; "As sung by Miss Nellie Beaumont in A Lucky Hoodoo", a musical review directed by Billy B. Van that toured nationwide between 1911 and 1912 (view)

 © June 30, 1910; 2 c. July 7, 1910, Class E (musical composition) 235359, Wallie Herzer, San Francisco
 © June 10, 1910, Class E (musical composition) 235359; notice received January 4, 2011, recorded Vol. 1, pg. 85, Wallie Herzer, San Francisco
 © Renewal 61361, January 10, 1938, Wallie Herzer, San Francisco

 "Tickle The Ivories", Rag
 Remick, publisher (1913)
 Solo piano version
 Cover: man playing piano, illustrated by Starmer (view)

 Remick, publisher (1912); 
 Song version
 Music by Herzer, words by Earle C. Jones (1878–1913)

 Remick, publisher (1913); 
 Music by Wallie Herzer; arranged by James C. McCabe (who sometimes used the pseudonym, Emmet Balfmoor); staff arranger for Remick

 © January 25, 1913; 2nd copy January 27, 1913; Class E (musical composition) 304389, Remick, New York
 © July 22, 1913; 2nd copy July 26, 1913, Class E (musical composition) 315301, Remick, New York
 © Renewal 89003 July 26, 1940, Wallie Herzer, San Francisco & Sally Starr, Detroit

 "Let's dance"; a rag turkey trot
 Remick, publisher (1913); 
 Cover: 5 couples dancing, yellow, blue, and black colors, illustrated by Starmer (view)

 © December 29, 1913; 2nd copy January 2, 1914; Class E (musical composition) 328852, Remick, New York

 "Get Over, Sal"; fox trot, one-step, two-step
 Remick, publisher (1914); 
 Cover: black, orange and white colors – eleven couples dancing with a waiter carrying cocktails, illustrated by L.S. Morgan

 Charles N. Daniels, San Francisco, publisher (1914); 
 Cover: black, orange, and white – eleven couples dancing with a waiter carrying cocktails, illustrated by L.S. Morgan (view)

 © December 5, 1914, 2nd copy December 12, 1914, Class E (musical composition) 354304
 © Transferred to Charles N. Daniels 1914
 © Renewal 111003, August 25, 1942, Wallie Herzer, San Francisco

 "Dance With Me"; hesitation waltz
 Wallie Herzer, publisher (1914); 
 Cover: purple and white colors – man and woman (in pantomime dress) dancing, illustrated by L.S. Morgan
 © December 5, 1914, 2nd copy December 12, 1914, Class E (musical composition) 354303
 © Renewal 111002 August 25, 1942, Wallie Herzer, San Francisco

 "Aloha Land"; Hawaiian waltz song
 Miller Music, New York, publisher (©1916, ©1918); 
 Words by W. Eager, music by Herzer

 Sherman, Clay & Co., San Francisco, publisher, (©1916, ©1918); 
 Cover: illustrated by Wesley Raymond De Lappe (1887–1952) (view)

 Sherman, Clay & Co., San Francisco, publisher, (©1916); 
 Music by Herzer, arrangement by Julius Lee Burbeck (1870–1949)

 © December 26. 1916; 2nd copy January 2, 1917; Class E 396686, Sherman Clay & Co., San Francisco
 © Renewal 131717, Sept. 11, 1944, by Herzer

 "Woman's Ways"; a musical satire
 Piano score
 Book by Sue Conly Posner (Susan Conleigh; 1886–1976), music by Herzer
 © 30 August 1917; Class E (musical composition) 407665, Wallie Herzer, San Francisco
 © Renewal 134351; December 5, 1944, Wallie Herzer, San Francisco

 "Come On To San Francisco"
 © February 11, 1938, Class E unpublished 160814, Wallie Herzer, San Francisco

 "Sky Rocket, Boom, Ah", song
 Unpublished
 © October 21, 1940, Class E (musical composition) unpublished 234680

 "Now and Always"; song
 Wallie Herzer, publisher
 © February 24, 1942, Class E (musical composition) unpublished 286391, Wallie Herzer, San Francisco
 © May 10, 1942, Class E (musical composition) published 104565, Wallie Herzer, San Francisco

 "Dish It Out"
 Walter Herzer, San Francisco
 Lyrics & Music by Herzer
 © November 19, 1942; Class E (musical composition) unpublished 315633, Walter Herzer, San Francisco

Selected piano rollography 

 "Everybody Two-Step"
 Angelus 25963 (matrix) (65 note roll)
 Angelus 90912 (matrix) (1912) (audio)
 Connorized Music Co. 2173 (matrix)
 Connorized Music Co. 3829 (matrix)
 Full Scale 14923 (matrix)
 Kimball F-6263 (matrix) (m), Popular Song Hits #2
 Kimball C-6164 (matrix)
 QRS 31027 (matrix)
 Rhythmodik B-5252 (matrix) Fred A. Schmitz
 Royal 4300 (matrix)
 Supertone 695418 (matrix) (65 note roll)
 Supertone 845418 (matrix)
 Universal 99845 (matrix)
 Universal 94505 (matrix) (m), "Rag Medley #11"
 US Music 65500 (matrix) (m), "States Medley #5"
 US Music 64518 (matrix)
 Virtuoso 81014 (matrix)
 Vocalstyle 1530 (matrix)

 "Aloha Land"
 Pianostyle 46198 (matrix)

Selected discography 

 "Everybody Two-Step", (instrumental version), Mike Bernard, piano (1912); 
 Columbia A-1266
 38467-1 (matrix) 
 Reissues (i) Vintage Jazz Mart (Europe) VLP2 & (ii) Smithsonian Folkways RF24
 Recorded in New York City December 2, 1912

 "Everybody Two-Step", Victor Military Band; 
 Victor Records B-12779 (matrix)
 Recorded January 9, 1913 (audio)

 "Everybody Two-Step"
 Billy Murray, vocalist
 Edison cylinder (1912) audio on YouTube

 "Everybody Two-Step"
 Chrysanthemum Ragtime Band, Dancing on the Edge of the World, Stomp Off Records (1987); 
 Recorded at Bay Records, Berkeley, California
 Re-released by Stomp Off Records, The Preserves, Vol. 1 (1992); 

 "Everybody Two-Step"
 Johnny Maddox, Très moutarde: Johnny Maddox Plays Rags, Blues, Waltzes, and Ballads, Paragon Productions SG-102 (1977); 
 Recorded in 1975 in Denver, Colorado
 Re-released by Crazy Otto Music, Sunflower Slow Drag (CD) (2005); 

 "Aloha Land"
  6229-A-4-10 (matrix); 
 Waikiki Hawaiian Orchestra, with Helen Louise & Frank Ferera
 Edison 50635

 "Aloha Land"
 G07326 (matrix); 
 Frank Ferera & Anthony Franchini (Hawaiian guitars), George Hamilton Green (xylophone)
 Gennett 9000 Series 9076A
 Recorded July 1920

Addresses 
Publishing Company
 Wallie Herzer, 241 Sansome Street, San Francisco

Residences
 1917–1937: 2360 Vallejo, San Francisco (Pacific Heights)
 1944–1955: 1801 Carmelita Avenue, Burlingame, San Mateo County, California
 1955–1961: 759 Roble Avenue, Menlo Park, California

Social and professional affiliations 
 The Olympic Club, San Francisco
 Wheelman (competitive bicyclist)
 1921: Fire Underwriters' Association of the Pacific
 1919: Plate Glass Underwriters Association of California, executive committee
 1902: Herzer was an amateur competitive tennis player

Family 
 Parents
Wallie Herzer's father, Hugo Herzer, Sr. (1845–1921), was born and raised in Bavaria, Germany, and emigrated to the United States in 1865.  His mother, Elizabeth (née Ulrich; 1855–1923) was born and raised in France, and emigrated to the United States in 1860.  Hugo, Sr., among other things, was engaged in civic service for the City of San Francisco, namely as Deputy Tax Assessor from about 1891 to 1901, then City Cashier in 1902 of the License Department of the Tax Assessor, and in 1905, Expert Searcher, Tax Office of San Francisco.  Hugo, Sr., was also a member and officer of the Turners; and, also was a member of the German-American Republican Club of San Francisco, and the Grant and Wilson Club.

 Siblings
Wallie was the youngest of five siblings.  One of his two brothers, Hugo G. Herzer, Jr. (1879–1921), was an operatic vocal instructor, first in Honolulu, in various capacities, including a position at the Honolulu School of Dramatic Art, from about 1902 to 1918. Hugo studied voice with Francis W. Stuart (1865–1939) at The King Conservatory of Music (Frank Louis King; 1854–1914) in San Jose in 1899. Hugo was a pedagogical  of Francesco Lamperti. Hugo married Agnes Lovell Lyle (maiden; 1887–1951) on March 2, 1907, in Honolulu.  Agnes was a soprano, pianist, and piano teacher.  In 1918, they both resettled in San Francisco.  After the death of Hugo, Jr., in 1921, Agnes remarried Robert Montgomery Gehl (1888–1971).

 Spouse
Wallie married Sylvia (née Scalmanini; 1885–1955) in San Francisco on May 4, 1910.  Sylvia's father, Carlo Scalmanini (1820–1891), had been a California Forty-Niner, a major vineyard owner-winemaker, co-owner, with Baptiste Frapolli (Italian spelling, Battiste; 1821–1890), of the Swiss Republic Restaurant at 19 Long Wharf, and, with Frapolli, a wholesale and retail grocer.  Wallie and Sylvia had one child, a daughter — Harriett C. Herzer (1911–1999) who married Colin Arthur Moreton (1910–1991).

References 
Catalog of Copyright Entries, Part 3 Musical Compositions, New Series, Library of Congress, Copyright Office

Original copyrights

Copyright renewals

Inline citations

1885 births
1961 deaths
American music publishers (people)
American male composers
20th-century American composers
Songwriters from California
Composers from San Francisco
Composers for piano
People from San Francisco
People from Burlingame, California
People from Menlo Park, California
Ragtime composers
Ragtime pianists
American ragtime musicians
Male pianists
20th-century pianists
20th-century American male musicians
American male songwriters